Icaro 2000 is an Italian aircraft manufacturer, based in Sangiano. The company specializes in the design and manufacturer of hang gliders, ultralight trikes and hang gliding helmets.

By the end of 2010, the company had sold over 9,000 hang gliders, including many used by world champions.

History

The company was founded in 1973 by Alfio Caronti and Peter Skarupp to produce Bill Moyes' hang glider designs under licence for boat towing. Franco Garzia & Gianni Hotz bought the company in 1981 and continued to produce Moyes' designs. By 1991, the company had sold more than 3,000 hang gliders and decided to develop its own designs and have each one DHV certified.

In 1992, Icaro 2000 introduced its first model, the Icaro Brazil. The highly successful Icaro Laminar was introduced in 1994 and remained in production in 2016, having been used by many world champions. The company introduced its first "topless" design, lacking a kingpost in 1996.

In 1998, the company starting making hang gliding helmets under the brand name 4fight.

During the mid-2000s, the company also produced paragliders, including the Icaro Cyber and Force. The company no longer sells paragliders.

Aircraft

See also

List of Italian companies

References

External links

Aircraft manufacturers of Italy
Hang gliders
Ultralight trikes